Massimo Enrique Sandi Béjar (born 12 May 2002) is a Peruvian footballer who plays as a goalkeeper for Cienciano, on loan from Alianza Lima.

Career statistics

Club

Notes

References

2002 births
Living people
Footballers from Lima
Peruvian footballers
Peru youth international footballers
Association football goalkeepers
Peruvian Primera División players
Club Alianza Lima footballers
Cienciano footballers